Rise is a village and civil parish in Holderness, the East Riding of Yorkshire, England. It lies to the east of the B1243 road.

The place-name 'Rise' is first attested in the Domesday Book of 1086, where it appears as Risun in the Holderness Wapentake. This is the plural of the Old English word 'hris', meaning 'brushwood'.

According to the 2011 UK census, Rise parish had a population of 105, a reduction on the 2001 UK census figure of 119.

Rise was served from 1864 to 1964 by Whitedale railway station on the Hull and Hornsea Railway, until the line was closed following the Beeching Report.

Rise Hall

East of the village is Rise Hall, a Grade II* listed historic house built between 1815 and 1820. In 2010 its restoration by property developer Sarah Beeny was the subject of a TV series, Beeny's Restoration Nightmare on Channel Four; the property was sold by her in 2019.

References

External links

Villages in the East Riding of Yorkshire
Holderness
Civil parishes in the East Riding of Yorkshire